This is a list of aircraft used by the Irish Air Corps during World War II. During World War II the Irish airforce obtained some aircraft through the confiscation of aircraft that had been forced to land in Ireland.

Fighters 
 Gloster Gladiator
 Hawker Hurricane

Bombers 
 Fairey Battle-1 confiscated

Maritime patrol 
 Supermarine Walrus
Avro Anson
 Lockheed Hudson-1 confiscated

Liaison or army cooperation aircraft 
 Vickers Vespa-Retired June 1940
 Westland Lysander

See also
 List of World War II weapons used in Ireland

References

Ireland
World War II Aircraft
Irish Air Corps
Ireland in World War II